Klamath National Forest is a  national forest, in the Klamath Mountains and Cascade Range, located in Siskiyou County in northern California, but with a tiny extension (1.5 percent of the forest) into southern Jackson County in Oregon. The forest contains continuous stands of ponderosa pine, Jeffrey pine, Douglas fir, red fir, white fir, lodgepole pine, Baker Cypress (Cupressus bakeri), and incense cedar. Forest headquarters are located in Yreka, California. There are local ranger district offices located in Fort Jones, Happy Camp, and Macdoel, all in California. The Klamath was established on May 6, 1905. This forest includes the Kangaroo Lake and the Sawyers Bar Catholic Church is located within the boundaries of the Forest. The Forest is managed jointly with the Butte Valley National Grassland.

Wilderness areas
There are four officially designated wilderness areas in Klamath National Forest that are part of the National Wilderness Preservation System. Two of them extend into neighboring national forests, and one of those into land managed by the Bureau of Land Management.
 Marble Mountain Wilderness
 Russian Wilderness
 Red Buttes Wilderness
 Siskiyou Wilderness (mostly in Six Rivers NF)
 Trinity Alps Wilderness (mostly in Trinity NF; partly in Shasta NF, Six Rivers NF, and BLM land)

Local Activism 
Between the late 1980s and 2010, the Klamath Forest Alliance played major roles in the "timber wars" in the Klamath/Siskiyou Bioregion of Northwest California and Southwest Oregon, including timber sale appeals and litigation to defend roadless areas, the Northern Spotted Owl controversy, and efforts to protect Ancient Forests through federal legislation.

References

External links
 
 Klamath National Forest official website
 Mid Klamath Watershed Council website
 Salmon River Restoration Council website
 Pictures: Wilderness in the Klamath Mountains
 Panoramic Videos: Outskirts of Klamath National Forest Drone footage of the Klamath National Forest

 
National Forests of California
National Forests of Oregon
Klamath Mountains
Klamath River
Protected areas of Jackson County, Oregon
Protected areas of Siskiyou County, California
Protected areas established in 1905
1905 establishments in California
1905 establishments in Oregon